Claptrap is a fictional character that appears in the Gearbox Software video game series Borderlands. He is considered the franchise's mascot, and often serves as the comic relief throughout the games. Claptrap initially received widespread negative reception from both critics and audiences alike, often being described as annoying, obnoxious, and "the worst", but despite the negative reception also became one of the franchise's most popular characters.

Character development 
Claptrap's development started from a random sketch in a low-level assignment made by the JIRA project-management software system. When Borderlands was first shown to the public in 2007, the game had a darker, more realistic visual style. In 2009 the game reappeared with a new look that Gearbox described as "concept art style", scrapping months of work for a style close to cel-shading, a style not often seen in the first-person shooter genre. Claptrap's original design, which GameSpot described as a "happy accident", was one of the few aspects that remained virtually unchanged throughout cess.

Claptrap's role has been a crucial part in setting the tone for the Borderlands games. Since his first appearance his role has been expanded, from being a part of a general group of NPCs to a "franchise-centric character". After Borderlands 2, making him a playable character in Borderlands: The Pre-Sequel was considered the logical next step.

Claptrap was voiced by David Eddings in the first four Borderlands games, but was replaced by Jim Foronda since Borderlands 2 VR following a public falling-out between Eddings and Gearbox CEO Randy Pitchford. Eddings claimed that he was offered sub-standard rates for voicing the character in Borderlands 3, and accused Pitchford of assault. Pitchford denied the claims, and called Eddings "bitter and disgruntled" after being fired from Gearbox.

Appearances 
Claptrap first appeared in the original Borderlands game in 2009, and has appeared in every Borderlands game, spin-off and DLC since then. He first appears as a playable character in Borderlands: The Pre-Sequel released in 2014, as well as their various DLC including The Secret Armory of General Knoxx, Claptrap's New Robot Revolution, Sir Hammerlock's Big Game Hunt, Tiny Tina's Assault on Dragon Keep,  and Commander Lilith & the Fight for Sanctuary. He appears as the main character of Claptastic Voyage, and later returned in Borderlands 3, in which he introduces Pandora. In this game he gets upgraded, granting him the ability to climb stairs.

When asked by website VG247 what Hollywood actor could play Claptrap on-screen, Gearbox members suggested Dwayne Johnson or Bill Murray, but it was announced that Jack Black will voice Claptrap in the upcoming Borderlands film.

In non-Borderlands media, he has appeared in Fortnite as part of a minigame and makes an easter egg cameo in the video game Torchlight II and the film Ready Player One. Claptrap is also one of the player's opponents in the crossover game Poker Night 2. Joshua Derocher of Destructoid noted that because Claptrap vocalizes his thoughts and acts on impulse, he makes for a terrible poker player.

Reception 
Claptrap has evoked both strong negative and positive responses from fans and critics alike. Alyse Stanley of Rock Paper Shotgun described him as an annoying but beloved character, and Tom Sykes of PC Gamer acknowledged this divide in reception by referring to him as a "beloved/behated mascot".

Multiple journalists of PC Gamer called Claptrap "the worst character" in an article dedicated to the character, where he was roundly trashed. Andy Kelly said that "When he starts dancing and beatboxing I want to toss him in a car crusher then eject the resulting yellow cube into a wormhole that leads directly to the shit dimension, where everything's made of shit." Shaun Prescott stated that "Claptrap is more annoying than virtually every other character and dialogue line in every single Borderlands game." Christopher Livingston described him as "Not good, but I'm sure not the worst. But definitely one of the worst." Jody Macgregor wrote that after playing the first Borderlands game he hated Claptrap "just like everyone else", but started changing his mind after playing Borderlands 2, which he attributed to the improved writing for the character. Fraser Brown stated that Claptrap "is just a minion, throw it in the bin." Wesley Fenlon claimed the character is "bad unless voiced by Keith David." Samuel Roberts claimed that "He wasn't bad until dubstep." Chris Capel of GameRevolution described Claptrap as a slightly annoying mascot, Andrew Webster of The Verge claimed that Claptrap is one of the most obnoxious robots, and Jamie Latour of TheGamer argued that "Claptrap's whole schtick is being obnoxious, but even a self-aware joke runs its course after being in literally every game."

Despite the negative reception, Claptrap was voted as one of Borderlands''' most popular characters by fans. Josh Hawkins of Shacknews wrote of the character that he is "by far one of the most beloved characters in the Borderlands series", and that playing as him in Borderlands The Pre-Sequel was a treat. When a fan of the Borderlands games contacted Gearbox to ask for his friend, who had recently passed away due to cancer and was a huge fan of the game to be eulogised by the character, Gearbox complied, and besides the eulogy also offered to add him as an NPC in Borderlands 2. Ed Grabianowski of Gizmodo referred to Claptrap as "the best character". Glixel staff ranked Claptrap as the 17th most iconic video game character of the 21st century.

A variety of merchandise has been made of Claptrap, portraying him as a talking car charger, Pop Toys, geek-themed controller holders, and a deluxe figure from McFarlane Toys, which Michael McWhertor of Kotaku praised for its detail.

Claptrap won the "Character of the Year" award at the Spike Video Game Awards in 2012. During Claptrap's bounty challenge in the video game Poker Night 2'', Claptrap bids with his Spike trophy.

References 

Borderlands (series)
Anthropomorphic video game characters
Fictional marksmen and snipers
Fictional mercenaries in video games
Male characters in video games
Video game characters introduced in 2009
Robot characters in video games
Video game mascots
Video game protagonists
Spike Video Game Award winners